Chester Township is one of the thirteen townships of Clinton County, Ohio, United States. As of the 2010 census the population was 1,967.

Geography
Located in the northwest corner of the county, it borders the following townships:
Caesarscreek Township, Greene County - northeast
Liberty Township - east
Union Township - southeast
Adams Township - south
Massie Township, Warren County - southwest
Wayne Township, Warren County - west
Spring Valley Township, Greene County - northwest

Caesar Creek State Park is partially located in Chester Township.

No municipalities are located in Chester Township.

New Burlington is a ghost town contained in the township.

Transportation
Major roads are Interstate 71 and State Routes 73 and 380.

Name and history
Chester Township was organized in 1810.

It is one of five Chester Townships statewide.

Government
The township is governed by a three-member board of trustees, who are elected in November of odd-numbered years to a four-year term beginning on the following January 1. Two are elected in the year after the presidential election and one is elected in the year before it. There is also an elected township fiscal officer, who serves a four-year term beginning on April 1 of the year after the election, which is held in November of the year before the presidential election. Vacancies in the fiscal officership or on the board of trustees are filled by the remaining trustees.

References
Clinton County Historical Society.  Clinton County, Ohio, 1982.  Wilmington, Ohio:  The Society, 1982.
Ohio Atlas & Gazetteer.  6th ed. Yarmouth, Maine:  DeLorme, 2001.  
Ohio. Secretary of State.  The Ohio municipal and township roster, 2002-2003.  Columbus, Ohio:  The Secretary, 2003.

External links
County website

Townships in Clinton County, Ohio
Townships in Ohio